A Threshal was a type of two handed Medieval flail, looking rather like a larger version of the more well-known Nunchaku. Considered a peasant's weapon, it was nonetheless capable of defeating many types of armor, as illustrated in contemporary manuscripts.

References

Flail weapons
Medieval weapons